The rupee was the currency of Zanzibar from 1908 to December 31, 1935. It was subdivided into 100 cents (Arabic: سنت).

History

The rupee replaced the Zanzibari ryal at a rate of 2⅛ rupees = 1 ryal and was equivalent to the Indian rupee, which was also in circulation. The Zanzibari rupee remained equal to the Indian rupee and was replaced on January 1, 1936, by the East African shilling at the rate of 1½ East African shillings = 1 Zanzibari rupee.

Coins

Bronze coins were introduced in 1908 in denominations of 1 and 10 cents, together with nickel 20 cents. No further issues of coins were made.

Banknotes

In 1908, banknotes were introduced by the government of Zanzibar in denominations of 5, 10, 20, and 100 rupees. 50- and 500-rupee notes were added in 1916, and 1-rupee notes were issued in 1920. All Zanzibari notes were withdrawn in 1936. All of these notes are very rare and valuable.

References

External links
 
History of Zanzibar

Currencies of Africa
Currencies of the British Empire
Modern obsolete currencies
Economy of Tanzania
History of Zanzibar
1908 establishments in Zanzibar
1935 disestablishments
Sultanate of Zanzibar